Rob Doyle (born 10 February 1964) is a Canadian-born Austrian ice hockey player. He competed in the men's tournament at the 1994 Winter Olympics.

Awards and honours

References

External links
 

1964 births
Living people
Olympic ice hockey players of Austria
Ice hockey players at the 1994 Winter Olympics
Ice hockey people from Ontario
Colorado College Tigers men's ice hockey players
National Hockey League supplemental draft picks
Detroit Red Wings draft picks
Adirondack Red Wings players
Flint Spirits players
Fort Wayne Komets players

AHCA Division I men's ice hockey All-Americans